Manaskent (Manasgent) is a rural locality (a selo) in Karabudakhkentsky District, Republic of Dagestan, Russia. The population was 4,994 as of 2010. There are 90 streets.

Geography 
Manaskent is located 14 km northeast of Karabudakhkent (the district's administrative centre) by road. Zelenomorsk is the nearest rural locality.

Nationalities 
Kumyks, Dargins and Laks live there.

References 

Rural localities in Karabudakhkentsky District